German submarine U-3010 was a Type XXI U-boat of Nazi Germany's Kriegsmarine.

Her keel was laid down on 13 July 1944 by DeSchiMAG AG Weser of Bremen. She was commissioned  on 11 November 1944 with Oberleutnant zur See Eberhard Ebert in command. Ebert handed over to Fregattenkapitän Erich Topp (Knight's Cross) on 9 March 1945, who commanded the boat until 26 April 1945. U-3010 conducted no war patrols. On 3 May 1945, she was scuttled at Kiel to prevent her from falling into Allied hands. The wreck was subsequently broken up.

Design
Like all Type XXI U-boats, U-3010 had a displacement of  when at the surface and  while submerged. The submarine was powered by two MAN SE supercharged six-cylinder M6V40/46KBB diesel engines each providing , two Siemens-Schuckert GU365/30 double-acting electric motors each providing , and two Siemens-Schuckert silent running GV232/28 electric motors each providing .

U-3010 was fitted with six  torpedo tubes in the bow and four  C/30 anti-aircraft guns. She could carry twenty-three torpedoes or seventeen torpedoes and twelve mines. The complement was five officers and fifty-two men.

References

Bibliography

External links

Type XXI submarines
U-boats commissioned in 1944
World War II submarines of Germany
1944 ships
Ships built in Bremen (state)
Operation Regenbogen (U-boat)
Maritime incidents in May 1945